Rein Raamat (born 20 March 1931) is an Estonian animation film director, artist and screenwriter. He is the first internationally successful Estonian animator and along with Elbert Tuganov is regarded as the "Father of Estonian Animation". He has directed many short animated films since the early 1970s and also produced over 20 documentary films.

Biography
Raamat was born in Türi, Järva County and graduated from the Estonian Art Institute in 1957 as a painter and between 1957–1971 worked as an artist and director in feature films based in Tallinn. In 1971, he founded his own animation studio, Joonisfilm, a division of the Tallinnfilm studio, and commenced making his own films. From 1989–1995 he was artistic director of Studio B which he established, employing some 120 people.

One of his notable films is "Põrgu" (Hell), released in 1983, that he based on the art of fellow Estonian Eduard Wiiralt from the 1930s.

Since the early 1990s he has been involved with many documentaries in Estonia. In 1998, he worked with journalist Martti Soosaar in producing the documentary "Enn Põldroosi härrasmeeste seltskond".

Selected filmography
1985 "Kerjus" (short)
1983 "Põrgu" (short)
1980 "Suur Tõll" (short)
1978 "Kas on ikka rasvane?" (short)
1978 "Põld" (short)
1977 "Antennid jääs" (short)
1976 "Kütt" (short)
1975 "Rüblik" (short)
1974 "Kilplased" (short)
1974 "Värvilind" (short)
1973 "Lend" (short)
1972 "Vari ja tee" (short)
1972 "Veekandja" (short)

References

External links

Biography at Toonzone.net
"Põrgu" (Hell) (1983) video

1931 births
Living people
Estonian film directors
Estonian screenwriters
20th-century Estonian male artists
21st-century Estonian male artists
People from Türi
Recipients of the Order of the White Star, 4th Class
Estonian animated film directors
Estonian animators